Domaine de la Romanée-Conti, often abbreviated to DRC, is an estate in Burgundy, France that produces white and red wine. It is widely considered among the world's greatest wine producers, and DRC bottles are among the world's most expensive. It takes its name from the domaine's most famous vineyard, Romanée-Conti.

History
In 1232, the Abbey of Saint Vivant in Vosne acquired 1.8 hectares of vineyard. In 1631 it was bought by the de Croonembourg family, who renamed it Romanée for reasons unknown. At the same time they acquired the adjacent vineyard of La Tâche.

In 1760, André de Croonembourg decided to sell the domaine and it became the subject of a bidding war between Madame de Pompadour, mistress of Louis XV of France, and her bitter enemy Louis François, Prince of Conti. The prince won, paying the massive sum of 8000 livres, and the vineyard became known as Romanée-Conti. But come the Revolution, the prince's land was seized and auctioned off.

The Romanée-Conti vineyard was bought by Nicolas Defer de la Nouerre, who in 1819 sold it to Julien Ouvrard for 78,000 francs. In 1869 it was bought by Jacques-Marie Duvault-Blochet, who went on to build the domaine we know today with the acquisition of the holdings in Échezeaux, Grands Échezeaux and Richebourg.

The 9.43 hectares of Romanée Saint-Vivant were bought in 1791 by Nicolas-Joseph Marey, son-in-law of the geometer Gaspard Monge. The Marey-Monge family sold off part of their holdings to the Latour family in 1898, leased the remaining 5.28 hectares to Domaine de la Romanée-Conti in 1966, and finally sold to the domaine in 1988. This last deal was financed by the sale and leaseback of the domaine's holdings in Échezeaux and some in Grands Échezeaux.

As one of Napoleon's generals, Louis Liger-Belair was well placed to acquire good vineyards. And from 1815 this he did - with his son Louis-Charles, he amassed 40 hectares of prime land, including all of La Tâche. By 1933 this had declined to 24 hectares and family squabbles over an inheritance led to the Liger-Belair's sale of La Tâche to the domaine. The domaine already owned 4 hectares of the adjacent Les Gaudichots vineyard from the Duvault-Blochet days, and after much legal wrangling in 1936 this and La Tâche, were combined into a single Grand cru monopole of La Tâche.

Vineyards

The vineyards are grouped around the village of Vosne-Romanée, on well drained slopes facing east and south-east. The average age of the vines is very old – around 44 years – and the vineyards are cultivated organically.

Soil supplements are limited to compost made from crushed vine roots, grape skins and residues from fermentation. To avoid compacting the soil with the use of tractors, horses were re-introduced to cultivate the vineyards of Romanée-Conti and Le Montrachet. Five hectares in La Tâche and Grands Échezeaux are now being cultivated biodynamically whereby the individual vines are treated with special natural preparations and according to a strict lunar timetable.
Yields are very low at an average of 25 hl/ha (the Grand Cru rendement is 35 hl/ha). In other words, it takes the produce of three vines to produce one bottle of Domaine de la Romanée-Conti. Yields are kept low through severe pruning early in the season, and green pruning (éclaircissage/vendange en vert) in July/August, with a 'passage de nettoyage' completed immediately before harvest, to cut out substandard grapes. At harvest time, the grapes are sorted into small baskets and individually examined for health on triage tables, before the winemaking begins.

Of its two most sought after red wines a wine writer has stated: "Romanée-Conti and La Tâche are masterpieces of equilibrium, associating the masculine and feminine characteristics in order to transcend them in a powerful and racy elixir. These wines reflect to perfection the aroma and tastes of the ripe fruit of old vines and the character of terroir. They attain such a perfection that one could not succeed in identifying the new wood in their complex structure."

Romanée-Conti

Grape variety: Pinot noir
Vineyard holding:  (monopole)
Average age of vines: 53 years
Average production: 450 cases
Average price per 75cl bottle: $21,336

Of its flagship wine produced from the Romanée-Conti vineyard, the wine critic Clive Coates has stated,

La Tâche

Grape variety: Pinot noir
Vineyard holding:  (monopole)
Average age of vines: 47 years
Average production: 1,870 cases
Average price per 75cl bottle: $5,174

Old bottles of Les Gaudichots can also be found and sell for vast prices, such as US$88,125 for a case of the 1929 vintage.

Richebourg

Grape variety: Pinot noir
Vineyard holding: 
Average age of vines: 42 years
Average production: 1,000 cases
Average price per 75cl bottle: $3,596

Romanée-St-Vivant

Grape variety: Pinot noir
Vineyard holding: 
Average age of vines: 34 years
Average production: 1,500 cases
Average price per 75cl bottle: $2,957

Grands Échezeaux

Grape variety: Pinot noir
Vineyard holding: 
Average age of vines: 52 years
Average production: 1,150 cases
Average price per 75cl bottle: $2,774

Échezeaux

Grape variety: Pinot noir
Vineyard holding: 
Average age of vines: 32 years
Average production: 1,340 cases
Average price per 75cl bottle: $2,516

Montrachet

Grape variety: Chardonnay
Vineyard holding: 
Average age of vines: 62 years
Average production: 250 cases
Average price per 75cl bottle: $8,611

References

Further reading
 Crum, Gert (2006). Le Domaine De La Romanee-Conti. Uitgeverij Lannoo NV. 
Hanson, Anthony (2004). Burgundy. Mitchell Beazley. pp. 310–313. 
 Olney, Richard (1995). Romanee-Conti: The World's Most Fabled Wine. Rizzoli.

External links
 Domaine de la Romanée-Conti official site
 Online sale of Romanée Conti
 

Romanee-Conti
Côte-d'Or

fr:Romanée-conti (AOC)